Volytsia-Poliova is a village and rural council (silska rada) in Khmelnytskyi Raion of Khmelnytskyi Oblast in western Ukraine. The village belongs to Teofipol settlement hromada, one of the hromadas of Ukraine. Its population was 830 as of the 2001 Ukrainian census.

History
Volytsia-Poliova was first founded in 1593. The village was previously called Volytsia Khaietskoho. In 1922, the Volytsia-Poliova Village Council was created which administers the village of Volytsia-Poliova itself.

Until 18 July 2020, Volytsia-Polova belonged to Teofipol Raion. The raion was abolished in July 2020 as part of the administrative reform of Ukraine, which reduced the number of raions of Khmelnytskyi Oblast to three. The area of Teofipol Raion was merged into Khmelnytskyi Raion.

See also
 Volytsia, a neighboring village in Teofipol Raion

References

Volhynian Governorate
Populated places established in 1593
Villages in Khmelnytskyi Raion